Libyan Sands: Travel in a Dead World (first published 1935; reprinted by Eland in 2010) is a travel book, written by Ralph A. Bagnold, the founder of the British Army's Long Range Desert Group in the Second World War. Described by Sahara expert Eamonn Gearon as "without question, the classic work of 20th-century Saharan exploration", it is a first-hand account of Bagnold's pioneering adventures in the Saharan desert during his time in the British army. It is still considered a classic work, and in 2010, it was reissued by Eland.

See also
The Physics of Blown Sand and Desert Dunes

References

1935 non-fiction books
British travel books
Books about the Sahara
Hodder & Stoughton books
Eland Books books
English non-fiction books